The 4 × 100 metres relay races at the 1984 Summer Olympics was contested as part of the athletics program.

Medalists

Abbreviations

Records
These were the standing world and Olympic records (in seconds) prior to the 1984 Summer Olympics.

The United States set a new world record in the final.

Results

Final

Semi-final
Heat 1

Heat 2

Heats
Heat 1

Heat 2

Heat 3

References

External links
Results

4 x 100 metres relay men
Relay foot races at the Olympics
Men's events at the 1984 Summer Olympics